David Schrader (born September 15, 1952 in Chicago, Illinois) is an American harpsichordist, organist, and fortepianist. He is a professor at the Chicago College of Performing Arts at Roosevelt University where he teaches music history and conducts chamber music ensembles. Schrader was the organist at Church of the Ascension, Chicago for 35 years.

Performances 
Schrader has appeared with the Chicago Symphony Orchestra on several occasions, at national conventions of the American Guild of Organists, with the Dallas Symphony Orchestra, the San Francisco Symphony Orchestra and the Colorado Symphony Orchestra, the Canadian period instrument orchestra Tafelmusik, and at Ravinia Festival. He can frequently be heard in a live performances on Chicago's classical music radio station WFMT.

Recordings 
Schrader has recorded a large number of CDs, among which are the following:
  Biber: Mensa Sonora with Baroque Band, Cedille Records, 2010: CDR 90000 116
George Frideric Handel: The Sonatas for Violin & Continuo with Rachel Barton Pine (violin) and John Mark Rozendaal (cello) – Cedille Records, 1996: CDR 90000 032
Trio Settecento: An Italian Sojourn with Rachel Barton Pine (violin) and John Mark Rozendaal (baroque cello) – Cedille Records, 2007: CDR 90000 099
Trio Settecento: A German Bouquet with Rachel Barton Pine (violin) and John Mark Rozendaal (viola da gamba and baroque cello) – Cedille Records, 2009: CDR 90000 114
Trio Settecento: A French Soirée with Rachel Barton Pine (violin) and John Mark Rozendaal (viola da gamba) – Cedille Records, 2011: CDR 90000 129
Trio Settecento: An English Fancy with Rachel Barton Pine (violin) and John Mark Rozendaal (viola da gamba) – Cedille Records, 2012: CDR 90000 135
 Scarlatti on Fortepiano, Sonatas by Domenico Scarlatti (1685–1757), Cedille Records CDR 90000 042
 Introducing David Schrader, Cedille Records  CDR 5003
 Soler: Harpsichord Sonatas (vol. 2), Cedille Records CDR 90000 009
 Organ Masterpieces by Franck & Dupré, Cedille Records CDR 90000 015
 Bach: Fantasies & Fugues, Cedille Records CDR 90000 012
 American Works for Organ and Orchestra, David Schrader on organ, Grant Park Symphony Orchestra / Carlos Kalmar, conductor, Cedille Records CDR 90000 063
 Bach: Goldberg Variations, Forces of Virtue Records
 George Friederic Handel: Cantatas, Centaur Records

References

External links 
Official website 
Interview with David Schrader, August 9, 1992

American classical organists
American male organists
American harpsichordists
Fortepianists
Roosevelt University faculty
Musicians from Chicago
Living people
1952 births
Classical musicians from Illinois
21st-century classical pianists
21st-century organists
21st-century American male musicians
21st-century American keyboardists
Cedille Records artists
Male classical organists